Lorena is an unincorporated community in Butler County, Kansas, United States.

History
Lorena had a post office from the 1870s until 1902.

Education
The community is served by Andover USD 385 public school district.

References

Further reading

External links
 Butler County maps: Current, Historic, KDOT

Unincorporated communities in Butler County, Kansas
Unincorporated communities in Kansas